Kuakari (also Romanized as Kūākarī; also known as Kūhakarī) is a village in Saheli-ye Jokandan Rural District, in the Central District of Talesh County, Gilan Province, Iran. At the 2006 census, its population was 286, in 75 families.

References 

Populated places in Talesh County